Lake County was one of the counties of New Zealand in the South Island. In 1986 it merged with the Queenstown Borough Council to form the Queenstown Lakes District Council.

See also 
 List of former territorial authorities in New Zealand § Counties

Counties of New Zealand
Politics of Otago